Reynald is a given name. Notable people with the name include:

Reynald de Châtillon (1125–1187), French Knight who served in the Second Crusade
Francis Reynald Wewengkang (born 1971), current Persija Jakarta Football player
Reynald Lemaître (born 1983), French football (soccer) midfielder
Reynald Pedros (born 1971), former French footballer of Spanish descent

See also
Acton Reynald, village in the far North of Shropshire, England

French masculine given names